The Missouri-Pacific Railroad Depot-Gurdon is a historic railroad station building at North 1st Street and East Walnut Street in Gurdon, Arkansas.  The single-story masonry building was built c. 1917 by the Missouri-Pacific Railroad to house passenger and freight service facilities.  It is built in the Mediterranean Renaissance style which was then popular for building such structures in Arkansas.  It has a red clay tile roof, Italianate bracketing, and Baroque quoin molding.

The building was listed on the National Register of Historic Places in 1992.

See also
National Register of Historic Places listings in Clark County, Arkansas

References

Railway stations on the National Register of Historic Places in Arkansas
Railway stations in the United States opened in 1917
National Register of Historic Places in Clark County, Arkansas
Gurdon
Former railway stations in Arkansas